Robert Burnier (1897–1974) was a French film actor.

Selected filmography
 When Do You Commit Suicide? (1931)
 Let's Get Married (1931)
 Miche (1932)
 The Porter from Maxim's (1933)
 Ciboulette (1933)
 Radio Surprises (1940)
 Dakota 308 (1951)
 L'Amour, Madame (1952)
 The Women Couldn't Care Less (1954)
 The Count of Bragelonne (1954)
 Rasputin (1954)
 Leguignon the Healer (1954)
 Your Turn, Callaghan (1955)
 More Whiskey for Callaghan (1955)
 Madonna of the Sleeping Cars (1955)
 The Bureaucrats (1959)
 La Belle Américaine (1961)
 All the Gold in the World  (1961)
 Landru (1963)
 Ophelia (1963)
 The Counterfeit Constable (1964)
 Marie-Chantal contre le docteur Kha (1965)
 Amour (1970)

References

Bibliography
 Goble, Alan. The Complete Index to Literary Sources in Film. Walter de Gruyter, 1999.

External links

1897 births
1974 deaths
French male film actors
Male actors from Paris